Team Brunel is a Volvo Ocean 65 yacht. She finished 3rd in the 2017–18 Volvo Ocean Race skippered by Bouwe Bekking and navigated by Andrew Cape.

She finished second in the 2014–15 Volvo Ocean Race, also skippered by Bouwe Bekking. The team is backed by Dutch project management company Brunel International, and sponsored by ACE, Abel Sensors and Embrace Tech Startups. Brunel International are Volvo Ocean Race veterans, having had their first involvement in 1997-98.

For the 2023 The Ocean Race she was renamed Team JAJO.

Team Brunel

2014–15 Volvo Ocean Race

Crew
The 2014-15 crew consisted of:

 Bouwe Bekking (skipper)
 Adam Minoprio (crew member)
 Dirk de Ridder (crew member)
 Andrew Cape (navigator)
 Gerd-Jan Poortman (crew member)
 Jens Dolmer (crew member)
 Louis Balcaen (crew member)
 Pablo Arrarte (crew member)
 Rokas Milevičius (crew member)
 Stefan Coppers, (onboard reporter)

Results
Team Brunel finished second in both the overall standings and the in-port series.

Overall standings

In-port series

2017–18 Volvo Ocean Race
The 2017–18 crew consisted of:

Onboard
 Bouwe Bekking (skipper)
 Annie Lush (trimmer)
 Abby Ehler (crew member)
 Andrew Cape (Navigator)
 Louis Balcaen (helmsman)
 Peter Burling (helmsman, watch captain and trimmer)
 Kyle Langford (trimmer)
 Carlo Huisman (helmsman, watch captain and trimmer)
 Alberto Bolzan (helmsman, watch captain and trimmer)
 Maciel Cicchetti (helmsman, watch captain and trimmer)

On-shore
 Anje-Marijcke van Boxtel (team coach)

Results
Team Brunel finished third in both the overall standings and the in-port series.

Overall standings

In-port series

Team JAJO

2023 The Ocean Race
The 2023 crew are:

 Jelmer van Beek (skipper)
 Laura van Veen (crew member)
 Jorden van Rooijen (bowman)
 Rutger Vos (boat captain, trimmer)
 Max Deckers (navigator)
 Bouwe Bekking (watch leader)
 Maja Micińska (trimmer)
 Simbad Quiroga (helmsman, trimmer)
 Joy Eilish Fitzgerald (crew member)
 Gregg Parker (grinder)
 Brend Schuil (onboard reporter)

References

Volvo Ocean Race yachts
Volvo Ocean 65 yachts
Sailing yachts of the Netherlands
2010s sailing yachts
Sailing yachts designed by Farr Yacht Design